William Peter Charles Ospreay (born 7 May 1993) is an English professional wrestler who is currently signed to New Japan Pro-Wrestling (NJPW), where he is the leader of the United Empire stable. He also wrestles for NJPW's United Kingdom based partner promotion Revolution Pro Wrestling (RevPro), where he is a former and longest reigning Undisputed British Heavyweight Champion.

Ospreay began his career in United Kingdom in 2012, on the UK independent circuit. In 2016, after being recommended by AJ Styles, he began to work with Japanese promotion New Japan Pro Wrestling as part of the junior heavyweight division, becoming a three-time IWGP Junior Heavyweight Champion and the winner of the 2016 and 2019 Best of the Super Juniors. In 2019, Ospreay also won the NEVER Openweight Championship. That same year, Ospreay participated in the G1 Climax, NJPW biggest tournament featuring heavyweight wrestlers. In 2020, he made his transition to the heavyweight division, where he won the IWGP World Heavyweight Championship. He is also the winner of 2021 New Japan Cup. In 2022, Ospreay won the IWGP United States Heavyweight Championship.

Ospreay has also wrestled periodically in the U.S., appearing in NJPW partner promotions All Elite Wrestling (AEW) and Ring of Honor (ROH) – where he is a former ROH World Television Champion – as well as independent promotions like Pro Wrestling Guerrilla (PWG).

Professional wrestling career

Early career
Ospreay cites the three-way match between A.J. Styles, Christopher Daniels and Samoa Joe at TNA Unbreakable as the match that made him want to become a wrestler. He received his training at Lucha Britannia's London School of Lucha Libre in Bethnal Green, London. He made his professional debut at the co-promoted BritWres-Fest on 1 April 2012 as the masked character Dark Britannico, the evil twin of Leon Britannico who was played by Paul Robinson, Ospreay's future tag team partner in the team The Swords of Essex. While wrestling with Lucha Britannia he twice won the Lucha Britannia World Championship. Ospreay said in his interview with the Huffington Post that his nickname, "The Aerial Assassin", is an allusion to the Assassin's Creed video game series and was a persona he adopted to stand out from other British high flying wrestlers, particularly Pac.

Progress Wrestling (2012–2019)
Ospreay soon became a regular for Progress Wrestling, debuting for them at Chapter Two: The March of Progress with Alex Esmail in a loss to The London Riots (James Davis and Rob Lynch). His performance earned him a place in the Natural Progression Series I tournament, aimed at scouting and showcasing new wrestlers. He lost in the first round to eventual winner Mark Andrews in November and again in a rematch the following May. Andrews who, as part of his reward for winning, picked Ospreay to enter the following Natural Progression Series tournament. The two met again in January 2014 in the first round of the Progress Tag Team Championship tournament, with FSU (Andrews' team with Eddie Dennis) defeating The Swords of Essex (Ospreay's team with Paul Robinson).

In his Natural Progression Series II opening match, his opponent Zack Gibson tried to win by holding the ropes. Robinson prevented Gibson using the ropes, which in turn distracted the referee for long enough for Gibson to low-blow Ospreay and make Ospreay submit. On 18 May, The Swords of Essex were one of the final two teams standing in a four-team elimination match to decide contenders to the Progress Tag Team Championship. During the match, Ospreay, having been isolated for some time, reached out to tag his partner but Robinson jumped off the apron and walked out on Ospreay. Ospreay was left on his own and lost the match, after which the Progress Champion Jimmy Havoc came to the ring and ordered London Riots to tie Ospreay. Havoc pulled out a knife and threatened to torture Ospreay, blaming it on Ospreay's popularity with the fans, before other wrestlers came out and intervened, freeing Ospreay. Havoc and The London Riots formed an allegiance known as Regression, which also featured Robinson.

On 27 July, Ospreay entered the eight-man, staggered entry elimination Thunderbastard match, the winner of whom can pick a time for a Progress Championship match. Ospreay entered the match third and was immediately low-blowed by Robinson, who had already entered, who disqualified himself in the hopes of taking out Ospreay. Ospreay recovered and eventually eliminated Marty Scurll last to win Thunderbastard. The following show saw Ospreay team up with FSU and Noam Dar in an eight-man tag team match with FSU and Havoc's respective titles, Ospreay's title contendership and everyone else's Progress contracts at stake, depending which individual lost. During the match, Ospreay moonsaulted from the Electric Ballroom's balcony onto his opponents, on the floor. Later, he had Havoc in position to be pinned but as he jumped from the top rope, Robinson dragged Havoc outside, leading Ospreay to pin Davis and end the London Riots' contract with Progress.

At the next event, Ospreay defeated Robinson and announced he would invoke his Thunderbastard right to challenge for Havoc's championship at the following show. He lost the championship match in January after Havoc loosened the top rope, making it more difficult for Ospreay to do high-flying moves, and used it as a weapon. During the Spring Bank Holiday weekend, Ospreay defeated El Ligero, Mark Haskins, Roderick Strong and Zack Sabre, Jr across two days to win the first Super Strong Style 16 tournament and once again lay claim to Havoc's championship. Their rematch took place on 26 July in a no disqualification match where the reinstated London Riots neutralised the threat of Robinson's interference and Ospreay ended Havoc's 609 day reign to become Progress Champion.

Ospreay successfully defended his title against the 2015 Thunderbastard Haskins and then Robinson. Robinson attacked Ospreay after losing to him, but Ospreay was saved by a returning Mark Andrews. Ospreay went on to finally beat Andrews to defend his title. Ospreay also headlined Progress' first main show outside of London in Manchester, in a triple threat match against Zack Gibson and Morgan Webster to close out 2015.

He lost the championship on 24 January 2016 to Marty Scurll when the referee stopped the match as Ospreay had passed out while being handcuffed in Scurll's chickenwing submission. Ospreay lost a rematch with Scurll at WrestleCon Supershow in Texas, USA in April and also lost a contendership match against Haskins on 31 July. He spent the rest of the year in showcase matches against non-regular Progress wrestlers, losing to Zack Sabre Jr., Shane Strickland, Matt Riddle and Adam Cole. Finally on 30 December, at a card composed exclusively of unannounced matches, Ospreay lost to Havoc. After the match Havoc invited Ospreay to join him in his fight against British Strong Style, who held the World and Tag Team Championship. Ospreay instead attacked Havoc and then realigned with Swords of Essex partner Paul Robinson. Ospreay attacked Havoc again, during the latter's Progress World Championship match leading to a Fans Bring The Weapons match in March. During the match, Ospreay challenged Havoc to put their Progress contracts at stake before losing the match and leaving the promotion.

Ospreay returned at the last event of 2017 as a mystery opponent for Progress Champion Travis Banks, however he lost the match. On chapter 61, Ospreay defeated Adam Brooks, this was his first victory in the promotion since losing the Progress Championship in 2016. At Progress Chapter 66, Ospreay defeated Mark Haskins.

On 7 May 2018, day 3 of the 2018 Super Strong Style 16 tournament, Ospreay challenged Jimmy Havoc to a match at Wembley Arena on September 30, 2018, but was forced to withdraw due to contractual obligations with New Japan Pro-Wrestling. The match was then set for Chapter 75, with Ospreay emerging victorious in a no disqualification, 2 out of 3 falls match with former tag team partner Paul Robinson as referee. At Chapter 82: Unboxing Live, Ospreay and Paul Robinson defeated Aussie Open (Kyle Fletcher & Mark Davis) to become the Progress Tag Team Champions.

United Kingdom independent circuit (2012–2017)
Ospreay has regularly wrestled for International Pro Wrestling: United Kingdom (IPW: UK) since September 2012 in singles matches, with Robinson as Swords of Essex and with Tom Dawkins as Spitfire Britannia, playing off their alter egos Pure Britannico and Neo Britannico for Lucha Britannia. Ospreay made it through to the final of the UK Super 8 tournament in both 2014 and 2015, losing to Zack Sabre, Jr and Rampage Brown respectively. He won the 30 man Battle Royale 2014 in April but failed to win it the following year when the All England Championship was on the line. On 28 March 2016, Ospreay lost a Loser Leaves Town match to his former Spitfire Britannia partner Dawkins.

The Swords of Essex began wrestling for Future Pro Wrestling (FPW) in May 2013 and after a series of wins became the first FPW Tag Team Champions after winning a four-way match. They held the titles for nine months and eventually became embroiled in a Best of Four match series against both The London Riots and The Alpha Males (Iestyn Rees & Charlie Garrett) for the FPW Tag Team Championship. The Swords of Essex failed to win a match in the series, with Ospreay wrestling the final match, which also had the London Riots' IPW:UK and New Generation Wrestling Tag Team Championship on the line, without Robinson. Ospreay has been unable to replicate similar success as a singles wrestler, twice entering the Zero G tournament but failing to win.

Ospreay also became a regular for Southside Wrestling Entertainment (SWE) from March 2014 onwards. After failing to win the Speed King Championship from Kay Lee Ray in a co-promoted show with Combat Zone Wrestling in October, he won it a fortnight later in a Six-Way Elimination match. He defended it over the following months to many SWE and guest wrestlers, eventually putting it on the line in the annual Speed King Tournament where he beat Mark Andrews in the semi-final in a Best of Three falls match but lost the title to El Ligero in a Six-Way Elimination match on 30 May 2015. The following March he unsuccessfully challenged Joseph Connors for the SWE Heavyweight Championship but on 7 August won the Speed King championship for the second time from Andrew Everett.

On 27 August 2016 Ospreay posted a Facebook live video unveiling a new British Triangle Championship with his three Swords of Essex partners Paul Robinson, Jerry Sevanchez, and Scott Wainwright. They announced that the trios championships were not specific to any promotion and could therefore be defended anywhere.

Ospreay wrestled a series of shows across 2016 for What Culture Pro Wrestling for both their weekly YouTube broadcast and iPPV shows, scoring wins over Noam Dar, Marty Scurll and feud with Martin Kirby. On WCPW Loaded #15 Ospreay defeated Martin Kirby with help from Adam Pacitti, Paul Robinson & Scott Wainwright, joining the Pacitti Club. At WCPW True Destiny, Ospreay teamed with Scotty Wainwright and defeated El Ligero & Gabriel Kidd and Johnny Moss & Liam Slater and Prospect (Alex Gracie & Lucas Archer) in a four-way ladder match to become WCPW Tag Team Champions. They lost the title to War Machine on an episode of Loaded. In August 2017, Ospreay made it to the finals of the Pro Wrestling World Cup, before losing to Kushida.

On 4 January 2017, Ospreay, along with fellow British wrestler Ryan Smile, started their own promotion, known as Lucha Forever, with their first show, The Dawning of Forever, taking place on 17 April in Birmingham.

Revolution Pro Wrestling (2013–present)
Ospreay debuted for Revolution Pro Wrestling (RevPro) on 10 February 2013 with a win over Mike Hitchman. He soon started appearing in tag matches with Paul Robinson as The Swords of Essex and, after earning contendership with a win over The London Riots, won the British Tag Team Championship on 15 June 2013 during RevPro's first show at York Hall by defeating Project Ego (Kris Travis and Martin Kirby). After losing to Ricochet in a singles match, The Swords of Essex lost their British Tag Team Championship to Ricochet and his partner Rich Swann, The Inner City Machine Gun on 15 March 2014.

On 19 October, Ospreay beat Josh Bodom for the British Cruiserweight Championship in a match that also included Swann. The day before, he had lost a match to Matt Sydal and so in May 2015 the two had a rematch. Although Ospreay won the rematch, with their series at 1–1 the two were booked in a Best of Three Falls match with the British Cruiserweight Championship on the line. After losing the first fall, he retained the title with two straight falls. After an eleven-month reign, with a number of title defences Ospreay lost the title back to Bodom on 5 September 2015.

Ospreay bounced back with wins over P. J. Black, René Duprée, and Ricochet, which put him in line for a three-way match for AJ Styles' British Heavyweight Championship, which also featured Marty Scurll, where the champion retained. The following day, on 3 October 2015 he lost to New Japan Pro-Wrestling's Kazuchika Okada. Okada, impressed with Ospreay, went on to recommend him to NJPW officials. This, along with endorsements from AJ Styles and Hiroshi Tanahashi, eventually led to Ospreay being signed by NJPW. In 2016 Ospreay beat Scurll and the new Cruiserweight Champion Pete Dunne in a non-title triple threat match, as well as beating Mike Bailey, which saw him earn a Cruiserweight Championship match against Dunne on 10 July which he won. The following month Ospreay headlined York Hall in a match against Vader. The feud began after Vader had criticised an NJPW Best of the Super Juniors match between Ospreay and Ricochet in May, comparing the match to "a gymnastics routine". The debate escalated over Twitter, with many wrestling journalists and veterans weighing in on the debate. Their match eventually took place on 12 August, with Ospreay losing to Vader after Dunne interfered while the referee was distracted. On 13 April 2017, Ospreay lost the British Cruiserweight Championship to interim champion Josh Bodom. Following a non-title contest against Zack Sabre Jr at 'Monday Night Mayhem' in Portsmouth in which Ospreay won, On 10 November 2017 at Global Wars, Ospreay failed to win the Undisputed British Heavyweight Championship from Zack Sabre Jr. At High Stakes on 14 February 2020, Ospreay defeated Sabre Jr. to win the Undisputed British Heavyweight Championship.

Various international promotions (2016–2017) 
On 29 January 2016, Ospreay made his debut for Total Nonstop Action Wrestling (TNA), during the promotion's tour of the United Kingdom. Ospreay unsuccessfully entered the 2016 Joker's Wild tournament and challenged for both the TNA King of the Mountain Championship and TNA World Tag Team Championship. Dave Meltzer of the Wrestling Observer Newsletter reported that TNA had plans to push Ospreay, but upon finding out that he had signed to appear for NJPW relegated him to a short match on their secondary television programme.

On 1 April 2016, Ospreay made his debut for Evolve, losing to Zack Sabre Jr. at Evolve 58 and Ricochet at Evolve 59, both in Dallas, Texas, USA. On 12 July, Paul Heyman, during a speaking tour of the United Kingdom, offered Ospreay an Evolve contract on behalf of Gabe Sapolsky while clarifying that the contract would not affect his NJPW deal. On 20 July, Pro Wrestling Torch reported Ospreay had signed the contract to make Evolve his American home promotion, but the Wrestling Observer Newsletter disputed this, reporting Ospreay did not sign and was still in talks with Evolve, PWG, TNA, and ROH, another American promotion who had a relationship with NJPW which Ospreay later confirmed.

In August 2017, Ospreay made his debut appearance for Pro Wrestling Australia (PWA) at their Sydney event Call to Arms. Originally scheduled to face PWA Heavyweight Champion Robbie Eagles in a non-title match for the main event, Eagles made the last minute decision to put his title on the line. Ospreay ultimately defeated Eagles, and won the PWA Heavyweight Championship for the first time. Afterwards, Ospreay announced that he was moving to Australia and would begin working regularly for PWA and other local independent promotions. Ospreay stated that he felt he could help the Australian wrestling scene grow, while the U.K. scene did not need him. Days later, Ospreay faced Adam Brooks in the main event of a Melbourne City Wrestling show, Ballroom Brawl; defeating him to win the MCW Intercommonwealth Championship.

New Japan Pro-Wrestling

IWGP Junior Heavyweight Champion (2016–2018)

After the Global Wars UK event, where Ospreay faced Kazuchika Okada, New Japan wrestlers Hiroshi Tanahashi, AJ Styles and Okada recommended him to NJPW. On 3 March 2016, Ospreay was announced as the newest member of the NJPW stable Chaos. Appearing in a video, Ospreay challenged Kushida to an IWGP Junior Heavyweight Championship match at Invasion Attack 2016 on 10 April. On 10 April, Ospreay failed in his title challenge against Kushida. Following the match, it was reported that NJPW had offered Ospreay a contract to become a regular for the promotion.

The following month, Ospreay entered the 2016 Best of the Super Juniors tournament. On 27 May, Ospreay faced Ricochet in the tournament in a match, which received widespread attention in the professional wrestling world. William Regal praised the match. Vader, however, compared the match to a "gymnastics routine". Ospreay won his block in the tournament with a record of four wins and three losses, advancing to the finals. On 7 June, Ospreay defeated Ryusuke Taguchi in the finals to win the 2016 Best of the Super Juniors, becoming the youngest winner in the history of the tournament as well as the first English and the fifth gaijin wrestler to win tournament. Following the win, Ospreay was granted another shot at the IWGP Junior Heavyweight Championship, but was again defeated by Kushida on 19 June at Dominion 6.19 in Osaka-jo Hall.

On 20 July, Ospreay entered the 2016 Super J-Cup, defeating Consejo Mundial de Lucha Libre (CMLL) representative Titán in his first round match. On 21 August, he was eliminated from the tournament in the second round by Matt Sydal. On 8 October, Ospreay received his first shot at the NEVER Openweight 6-Man Tag Team Championship, but he and his Chaos stablemates Beretta and Rocky Romero were defeated by the defending champions, David Finlay, Ricochet and Satoshi Kojima. On 11 February 2017 at The New Beginning in Osaka, Ospreay unsuccessfully challenged Katsuyori Shibata for the British Heavyweight Championship. In May, Ospreay won his block in the 2017 Best of the Super Juniors tournament with a record of five wins and two losses, advancing to his second consecutive final. On 3 June, Ospreay was defeated in the final by Kushida.

On 9 October at King of Pro-Wrestling, Ospreay defeated Kushida to win the IWGP Junior Heavyweight Championship for the first time. With the win, Ospreay became the first British IWGP Junior Heavyweight Champion. He lost the title to Marty Scurll in his first defence on 5 November at Power Struggle. Ospreay regained the title from Scurll on 4 January 2018 at Wrestle Kingdom 12 in Tokyo Dome in a four-way match, also involving Hiromu Takahashi and Kushida. On 10 February, Ospreay retained the title against Hiromu Takahashi at The New Beginning in Osaka. On 1 April, Ospreay successfully retained the title against Marty Scurll at Sakura Genesis. During the match, Ospreay was legitimately injured after his foot hit the rope mid-rotation after attempting a Spanish Fly off of the ring apron, causing him to land on his head on top of the apron and begin bleeding profusely from his scalp. At Wrestling Dontaku 2018 after successfully defending his title in a rematch against Kushida, he was attacked by the newest Bullet Club member, Taiji Ishimori. He entered the 2018 Best of the Super Juniors, finishing the tournament with 5 wins and 2 losses, but didn't advance to the finals due to his loss against Ishimori on the first day of the tournament. Ospreay lost the IWGP Junior Heavyweight Championship to the winner of the tournament, Hiromu Takahashi at Dominion 6.9 in Osaka-jo Hall on 9 June in his fourth defense. At Fighting Spirit Unleashed, Ospreay entered a tournament to crown a new IWGP Junior Heavyweight Champion, due to Takahashi getting a neck injury and forcing him to vacate the belt, and lost against Marty Scurll.

Move to the heavyweight division (2018–2020) 
At King of Pro-Wrestling (2018), Ospreay teamed with Hirooki Goto and Tomohiro Ishii in a winning effort against Suzuki-gun, represented by Minoru Suzuki, Takashi Iizuka and NEVER Openweight Champion Taichi. Ospreay pinned Taichi for the win.
After the match, Ospreay called out Taichi for a NEVER Openweight Championship match and doing so, hinting going to the Heavyweight division, although, it's still possible that Ospreay might be staying in the Jr. Heavyweight division as the Openweight title can be held by people from either division. The match was made official for Power Struggle (2018), however, it was announced on Twitter that the match had been cancelled due to Ospreay's injury. On the final day of World Tag League, Ospreay returned to New Japan, where he defeated Taichi. On the same night, he challenged the new NEVER Openweight Champion, Kota Ibushi, to a championship match at Wrestle Kingdom 13.

On 4 January, at Wrestle Kingdom 13, Will Ospreay defeated Kota Ibushi to capture the NEVER Openweight Championship. He became the first Junior Heavyweight to hold the championship. He made his first title defense at RevPro New Year's Resolution, where he defeated Chris Brookes. On 22 February, Ospreay successfully retained the title against Dalton Castle at Honor Rising: Japan 2018. At New Japan's Anniversary Show, he faced IWGP Heavyweight Champion Jay White in a losing effort.

Despite still being classified as a Junior Heavyweight, Ospreay entered the 2019 New Japan Cup, beating Bad Luck Fale and Lance Archer, before being eliminated by fellow Chaos member Kazuchika Okada. It was announced that Ospreay will face ROH Television Champion Jeff Cobb in a Winner takes all match at G1 Supercard. At the event, Ospreay lost the match, in the process losing his title to Cobb, who retained his title.

Ospreay participated in the 2019 edition of Best of the Super Juniors, where he won his block with a record of 7–2, advancing to the final. In the preliminary rounds, he suffered losses against long-time rivals Robbie Eagles and El Phantasmo. On 5 June Ospreay defeated Shingo Takagi to win the tournament for the second time, earning an IWGP Junior Heavyweight Championship match at Dominion. The match between Ospreay and Shingo was awarded a 5.75 rating by Dave Meltzer of the Wrestling Observer Newsletter, the highest rating for a wrestling match in 2019. This was also the first match in which Shingo Takagi was pinned after his debut in NJPW. At Dominion, Ospreay defeated Dragon Lee and became IWGP Junior Heavyweight Championship for the third time in his career. With this wrestling match being awarded 5 stars, Dave Meltzer and Bryan Alvarez suggested that Will Ospreay has reached a point in his career where he is a serious contender for being the best wrestler in the world. After winning the title, Ospreay announced his intention to enter the G1 Climax 29 in his quest of bridging the gap between heavyweight and junior heavyweight wrestlers. Later that week, Ospreay was announced as a participant in the 2019 G1 Climax. Ospreay made his first IWGP Junior Heavyweight Championship title defense against Robbie Eagles at Southern Showdown in Melbourne.

He started the G1 Climax campaign at G1 Climax in Dallas, where he was defeated by Lance Archer. He obtained his first win by defeating Sanada, but lost in the third round of the tournament against Kota Ibushi in a rematch from Wrestle Kingdom. Between the second and the thirds round, he suffered a legit injury that almost made him unable to participate further in the G1 Climax, but nevertheless, he managed to get cleared in a very short amount of time. Afterwards, Ospreay faced the leader of Chaos, Kazuchika Okada in the main events of Night 7 of the G1 Climax, yet lost in another well-received match.

On January 4, 2020, at Wrestle Kingdom 14, Ospreay lost the IWGP Junior Heavyweight Championship to Hiromu Takahashi. He suffered an heel injury during the match, reportedly from landing on his feet when Takahashi dropped him from the top rope.

United Empire (2020–present) 

On 2 February at The New Beginning in Sapporo, Ospreay was unsuccessful at winning British Heavyweight Championship from Zack Sabre Jr. On 4 February during the Road to New Beginning tour, Ospreay pinned Sabre Jr. in a tag team match between Chaos and Suzuki-gun. After the match, Ospreay challenged Sabre Jr. to another match for the title which was scheduled at RevPro's High Stakes event. At the event, Ospreay defeated Sabre Jr. to win the British Heavyweight Championship. After the match, Ospreay announced that he will be moving to the heavyweight division.

Ospreay was supposed to be part of the 2020 New Japan Cup starting on March 4; however, NJPW suspended all of its activities in late February due to the COVID-19 pandemic. Although the company eventually resumed its activities with the New Japan Cup in June, travel limitations due to the pandemic have prevented most foreign wrestlers from returning to Japan. Ospreay made his return in September, where Ospreay participated in his second G1 Climax in the A Block where he ended his G1 run with twelve points. At the night 17 of the G1 Climax, Ospreay defeated Kazuchika Okada after interference from Ospreay's girlfriend Bea Priestley and the returning young lion Great-O-Khan. After the match, Ospreay attacked Okada, turning heel, leaving Chaos, and forming a new stable called United Empire. Ospreay then won the 2021 New Japan Cup as well as winning the right to challenge Kota Ibushi for the IWGP World Heavyweight Championship at Sakura Genesis. At the event, Ospreay defeated Ibushi to win the IWGP World Heavyweight Championship for the first time as well as becoming the first British holder of NJPW's top championship. At Wrestling Dontaku, Ospreay made his first defense of the title when he defeated Shingo Takagi. However, he suffered a neck injury during the match and was forced to vacate the title on May 20, 2021.

Just three months after his injury, Ospreay made a surprise return at Resurgence on August 14. He delivered a promo declaring himself as the true IWGP World Heavyweight Champion due to him never being beaten for the title and revealed a separate and identical belt. He also claimed recognized IWGP World Heavyweight Champion Shingo Takagi to be an "Interim champion" as well as revealing himself out of the G1 Climax 31. He also said he would be competing on New Japan's American show Strong.

In the build-up to Wrestle Kingdom 16, it was announced that Ospreay would face the winner of the January 4 main event, on January 5, to unify the World Championships. On January 4, Kazuchika Okada defeated Shingo Takagi to win the World Championship. On January 5, Okada defeated Ospreay to win and unify both World Championships. 

After his defeat, Ospreay stuck around in Japan, teaming with his United Empire teammates. Ospreay was eventually announced for that year's New Japan Cup. In the tournament, he defeated Bushi, El Phantasmo and IWGP United States Heavyweight Champion Sanada, to make it to the tournament quarterfinals. During his third-round match, Ospreay fractured Sanada's orbital bone causing him to win the match by referee stoppage. In the quarterfinal round, he lost to the eventual winner Zack Sabre Jr. After the tournament, at Hyper Battle, it was announced Sanada would be forced to vacate the US title, in which Ospreay and former champion Hiroshi Tanahashi expressed interest in fighting for the vacant title. Ospreay returned to the NJPW United States shows on 16 April at Windy City Riot to face Jon Moxley, who Ospreay had called out at Resurgence and in post-match interviews during his New Japan Cup run. At the event, he was defeated. Ospreay challenged for the US title at Capital Collision on May 14 in a four way match, involving Tanahashi, Moxley and Juice Robinson, but failed to win the championship after being pinned by Robinson. Ospreay, along with Sanada, was set to get another title shot, at Dominion 6.12 in Osaka-jo Hall on June 12 in a Three-way match; however, when Robinson had to vacate the championship due to suffering from appendicitis, Ospreay faced Sanada one-on-one for the vacant championship, where he was victorious.

Also on June 12th during Dominion, Ospreay was announced as a participant in the G1 Climax 32 tournament starting in July, as apart of the D block. Ospreay scored 8 points in his block, advancing to the semi-finals and gaining the physical IWGP United States Championship from former champion Juice Robinson and David Finlay, who both competed in the D Block. In the semi-final round, Ospreay defeated C Block winner Tetsuya Naito to advance to the tournament finals. In the finals, Ospreay lost to Okada.

Following his G1 loss, Ospreay continued to defend his IWGP United States Heavyweight Championship, avenging a D-Block G1 loss to David Finlay and defeating him at NJPW Burning Spirit in September. In October at Royal Quest II, Ospreay defeated Shota Umino. At Battle Autumn in November, Ospreay again retained the title, defeating Tetsuya Naito once more. After his defence against Naito, Ospreay was confronted by Umino, who made his return to Japan and was struck down by him. Umino challenged Ospreay for the US Championship at Historic X-Over, where at the event Ospreay defeated him. After the match, Kenny Omega of All Elite Wrestling appeared on the titantron belittling Ospreay and challenged him to an IWGP United States Heavyweight Championship match at Wrestle Kingdom 17, a challenge which Ospreay accepted. Ospreay lost the championship to Omega at Wrestle Kingdom, ending his reign at 206 days.

Ring of Honor (2016–2018)
On 8 November 2016, Ring of Honor (ROH) announced that Ospreay had signed a contract with the promotion, which went into effect on 1 December. On 18 November, Ospreay defeated Bobby Fish in his ROH debut match in Liverpool to become the new ROH World Television Champion. He lost the title to Marty Scurll two days later, during the final day of ROH's three-day tour of the United Kingdom. Ospreay had been given another opportunity to regain the title in a four corners match at ROH's December pay-per-view, Final Battle 2016, but Scurll retained his title. At Final Battle 2017, Ospreay was defeated by Matt Taven.
On ROH TV, on 15 September 2018, Jay Lethal issued an open challenge and it was answered by Ospreay, who said: "I Need the World Title". The Match was signed for ROH Death Before Dishonor later that month in which Ospreay lost.

Frontline Wrestling (2018–2019)
In 2018, Ospreay announced that he would be starting his own promotion, Frontline Wrestling. He said that Frontline would be a British Puroresu style company and that wants to take wrestling in England back to being seen as a sport. On 28 June 2018 they ran their first event, "Build Me An Empire". Upon the one year anniversary of the promotion, Ospreay sold Frontline to move to Japan and pursue a full time schedule in New Japan Pro Wrestling.

All Elite Wrestling (2022–present)

Two weeks after United Empire teammates Great-O-Khan and Jeff Cobb debuted on AEW Dynamite, by attacking Roppongi Vice and FTR, Ospreay made his surprise debut for the All Elite Wrestling on the June 8 2022 episode of AEW Dynamite, where along with other stablemates Aaron Henare and Kyle Fletcher and Mark Davis of Aussie Open, he attacked Trent Beretta and FTR. On June 10 2022 edition of AEW Rampage, Beretta and FTR picked up a victory against United Empire's Ospreay and Aussie Open's Davis and Fletcher. Ospreay competed in his first singles match at the June 15th special episode of Dynamite, Road Rager, where he defeated Dax Harwood. After the match Ospreay and United Empire stablemates attacked FTR and Roppongi Vice once more, only to be interrupted by Orange Cassidy, who stared down Ospreay. Soon after a singles match between both men was scheduled for AEW×NJPW: Forbidden Door, for Ospreay's newly won IWGP United States Heavyweight Championship.At AEW×NJPW: Forbidden Door, Ospreay successfully defended the IWGP US Heavyweight Title against Orange Cassidy. After the match, Ospreay and Aussie Open attacked Cassidy and Roppongi Vice, only to be stopped by Katsuyori Shibata, who attacked the trio.

On July 27, the AEW World Trios Championship was revealed, with Ospreay and Aussie Open being named as participants in the inaugural tournament. On August 24, Ospreay and Aussie Open defeated Death Triangle to progress to the semifinals, where they were defeated by The Elite (Kenny Omega and The Young Bucks) on August 31. After the match, United Empire attacked The Elite.

Professional wrestling style and persona

Hailed as one of the greatest wrestlers in the world today, Opsreay was known for his high-flying, high-risk style of wrestling, being nicknamed "The Aerial Assassin". As a junior heavyweight, Ospreay used a springboard cutter named the OsCutter as his finishing maneuver. This high-risk style has caused concern about Ospreay's health and length of his career. This included a neck injury he suffered against Marty Scurll on 1 April 2018.

After his match against Kota Ibushi at Wrestle Kingdom 13, Ospreay shortened his nickname to "The Assassin" and debuted a new finisher, a swinging back elbow he later named the Hidden Blade. Since his transition to the Heavyweight division in 2020, Ospreay bulked up in size and muscle. This led to him changing his in-ring style, as he continued to use some high-flying offense but also utilized a range of technical skill as well as lifting moves like backbreakers, which includes his current finisher named Stormbreaker.

Personal life 
From 2017, Ospreay was in a relationship with fellow professional wrestler Bea Priestley. In 2019, the couple revealed they were planning on moving to Japan due to both of their wrestling schedules there. As of 2021, the two have split. 

As part of the Speaking Out movement, Ospreay was accused of blacklisting Pollyanna, a former wrestler, after she made allegations towards Ospreay's friend and Swords of Essex teammate Scott Wainwright. Independent wrestling promotion International Wrestling League (IWL) stated on Twitter that a venue asked them to remove Pollyanna from a show at the request of Ospreay. However, it was later revealed by IWL that the venue, rather than Ospreay, had requested her removal. The person running the IWL Twitter account later revealed that the supposed evidence was really their opinion on an "unclear situation".

In 2019, Ospreay was diagnosed with attention deficit hyperactivity disorder (ADHD) and autism.

Championships and accomplishments

Future Pro Wrestling
FPW Tag Team Championship (1 time) – with Paul Robinson
FPW Tag Team Championship Tournament (2014)

Inside The Ropes Magazine
 Ranked No. 10 of the top 50 wrestlers in the world in the ITR 50 in 2020.

Lucha Britannia
Lucha Britannia World Championship (2 times)

Melbourne City Wrestling
MCW Intercommonwealth Championship (1 time)

New Japan Pro-Wrestling
IWGP World Heavyweight Championship (1 time)
IWGP United States Heavyweight Championship (1 time)
IWGP Junior Heavyweight Championship (3 times)
NEVER Openweight Championship (1 time)
New Japan Cup (2021)
Best of the Super Juniors (2016, 2019)
Sixth Triple Crown Champion

Preston City Wrestling
PCW 'One to Watch in 2015' End of Year Award (2014)

Progress Wrestling
Progress Championship (1 time)
Progress Tag Team Championship (1 time) – with Paul Robinson
Super Strong Style 16 (2015)
Thunderbastard (2014) 

Pro Wrestling Australia
PWA Heavyweight Championship (1 time)

Pro Wrestling Illustrated
Ranked No. 7 of the top 500 singles wrestlers in the PWI 500 in 2021

Reloaded Championship Wrestling Alliance
RCWA Elite-1 Championship (1 time)

Revolution Pro Wrestling
Undisputed British Heavyweight Championship (1 time)
British Cruiserweight Championship (2 times)
Undisputed British Tag Team Championship (1 time) – with Paul Robinson
 Second Triple Crown Champion

Ring of Honor
ROH World Television Championship (1 time)
Best Move of the Year (2017) – 

SoCal Uncensored
Match of the Year (2016) with Matt Sydal & Ricochet vs. Adam Cole & The Young Bucks (Matt Jackson & Nick Jackson) on September 3

Southside Wrestling Entertainment
SWE Speed King Championship (2 times)

Sports Illustrated
 Ranked No. 6 of the top 10 men's wrestlers in 2018
 Ranked No. 5 of the top 10 wrestlers in 2022

Tokyo Sports
Best Bout Award (2022) vs. Kazuchika Okada on August 18

Warrior Wrestling
Warrior Wrestling Championship (1 time)

What Culture Pro Wrestling/Defiant Wrestling
WCPW Tag Team Championship (1 time) – with Scotty Wainwright
Defiant Wrestling Award for Match of the Year (2017) – 

Wrestling Observer Newsletter
Best Flying Wrestler (2016–2019)
Best Wrestling Maneuver (2019, 2022) – 
Non-Heavyweight MVP (2018, 2019)
Europe MVP (2021, 2022)
Most Outstanding Wrestler (2019, 2022) 
Pro Wrestling Match of the Year (2019) 

Other titles
British Triangle Championship (1 time) – with Paul Robinson and Scott Wainwright

References

External links 

 
 
 
 

 

1993 births
21st-century professional wrestlers
Chaos (professional wrestling) members
English male professional wrestlers
Expatriate professional wrestlers in Japan
Living people
People from the London Borough of Havering
IWGP World Heavyweight champions
IWGP Junior Heavyweight champions
IWGP United States Champions
NEVER Openweight champions
ROH World Television Champions
Sportspeople with autism
People with attention deficit hyperactivity disorder
PROGRESS World Champions
PROGRESS Tag Team Champions
Undisputed British Cruiserweight Champions
Undisputed British Heavyweight Champions